The 2010 Miami Valley Silverbacks season was the fifth season for the Continental Indoor Football League (CIFL) franchise. The 2010 Silverbacks announced they will continue play in the CIFL as a full travel squad. The team named former Cincinnati Swarm (af2), Louisville Fire (af2) and Cincinnati Marshals (NIFL) assistant Brian Wells as head coach. The 2010 Silverbacks finished the regular season with, at the time, the best winning percentage in team history (.400) and their second ever playoff berth. The Silverbacks were eliminated in the first round by the eventual CIFL Champion Cincinnati Commandos.

Standings

Schedule

Playoff Schedule

Roster

Stats

Passing

Rushing

Receiving

Regular season

Week 1: vs. Cincinnati Commandos

Week 4: vs. Wisconsin Wolfpack

Week 5: vs. Fort Wayne FireHawks

Week 6: vs. Chicago Cardinals

Week 7: vs. Cincinnati Commandos

Week 8: vs. Marion Mayhem

Week 9: vs. Fort Wayne FireHawks

Week 10: vs. Wisconsin Wolfpack

Week 12: vs. Chicago Cardinals

Week 14: vs. Marion Mayhem

References 

2010 Continental Indoor Football League season
Dayton Sharks
Miami Valley Silverbacks